The House Next Door is a stand-alone book that has three fictional stories in it.

Plot
This book has three short stories in it. James Patterson writes each of the stories with one of the coauthors of the book.

The first story, "The House Next Door" (written by Patterson and Susan DiLallo), is about a family living next to a derelict house that has just been occupied by a mysterious man and his son. As the family and the neighbors get to know the house's new occupants, what they learn is truly frightening.

"The Killer's Wife," written by Patterson and Max DiLallo, is about a detective's quest to find what has happened to four girls who have gone missing. To do this he decides the only way to find them is to get on the good side of the wife of the man suspected of abducting them. He is knows he is walking a fine line and his plan could go all wrong.

"We.Are.Not.Alone." is written by Patterson and Tim Arnold. It's about a scientist who has been looking for alien life for years and who is no longer taken seriously. He one day gets a message from space proving intelligent aliens exist. While that's what he wanted, he quickly finds others suddenly want to seize him and whisk him away, so he runs for his life.

Reviews
The House Next Door did not immediately make The New York Times best sellers list. It did so as a mass market monthly book for the month of December 2019.

References

2019 short story collections
Grand Central Publishing books
Novels by James Patterson